Philip Lazarovici is a neuropharmacologist at the Hebrew University of Jerusalem and a member of the Institute of Drug Research of the School of Pharmacy.

Education
Philip was born to Bracha (Fishler) and Leon Lazarovici on 1 October 1949 in Roman, Romania to a Jewish family. When he was 13 years old, his family immigrated to Israel where he developed an early interest in biology. He attended the Alliance Israélite Universelle-Carmia High School in Jerusalem and later, he enrolled in Israeli Defense Forces (IDF) Armored Infantry until 1971, serving as first sergeant. He completed his Bachelor of Science in biology, Master of Sciences  in zoology, and Doctor of Philosophy (PhD) in toxicology, all from The Hebrew University of Jerusalem, Israel. He began his postdoctoral fellowship in Neurobiology at The Weizmann Institute of Science, Rehovot, Israel.

Research and career
Lazarovici mainly researched on a variety of cellular and molecular aspects in the fields of neuroscience and cancer with a major emphasis on nerve growth factor (NGF) and toxins action, to dissect and characterize different biological aspects and to provide lead compounds for drug development. He along with his NIH colleagues, has contributed to the consensus-signaling map of NGF in neuronal differentiation, which has been recognized by the Signal Transduction Knowledge Environment (STKE).

He developed and investigated different neuroprotective compounds and approaches towards neuronal ischemia in stroke, and traumatic brain injury. Lazarovici also contributed to the characterization of NGF angiogenic properties and characterization of human umbilical cord blood-derived stem cells. He is best known for his work on heterologous down-regulation of EGF receptor by NGF, which would appear to be an efficient mean of desensitizing the neurons to proliferative signals.

Lazarovici pursued neuroscience as a visiting associate in the Section on Growth Factors at National Institute of Child Health and Human Development, NIH, Bethesda, MD, USA. After completion of his research, he joined as Lecturer in The School of Pharmacy, The Hebrew University of Jerusalem and later he became the full Professor. He is an active member of the Israel Societies for Physiology and Pharmacology (ISPP), and Neuroscience (ISN), American Societies for Neuroscience (ASN), and Pharmacology and Experimental Therapeutics (ASPET). Lazarovici was part of the Israeli group developing with TEVA Co. the drug for Parkinson’s named Rasagiline (Azilect). Lazarovici is one of the highly cited author with a h-index of 49, he published around 235 scientific articles and edited six books in his field of research.

Patents
Lazarovici, together with his collaborators, obtained many patents for his inventions. His patents include; "Three-dimensional scaffolds for tissue engineering made by processing complex extracts of natural extracellular matrices"; "Near-infrared fluorescent particles and uses thereof"; "Soy-derived bioactive peptides for use in compositions and methods for wound healing, tissue engineering, and regenerative medicine"; and "Viperistatin-derived peptides and uses thereof".

Publications

References

Living people
1949 births